Shan Tsui is a village in the Sha Tau Kok area of North District of Hong Kong.

Administration
Shan Tsui is a recognized village under the New Territories Small House Policy. It is one of the villages represented within the Sha Tau Kok District Rural Committee. For electoral purposes, Shan Tsui is part of the Sha Ta constituency, which is currently represented by Ko Wai-kei.

History
At the time of the 1911 census, the population of Shan Tsui was 367. The number of males was 162.

The three Hakka villages of Tam Shui Hang, Tong To and Shan Tsui had a total population of around 1,000 persons in
1961. During the Cultural Revolution, the villagers of these three places removed a Tin Hau image from a Man Mo temple located across the border in Mainland China and built a temple at the western end of Kong Ha Village to house the image. The temple was under the management of a special trust, the Sam Wo Tong.

References

External links

 Delineation of area of existing village Shan Tsui (Sha Tau Kok) for election of resident representative (2019 to 2022)

Villages in North District, Hong Kong
Sha Tau Kok